Lieutenant General Mohammed Farid Hegazy (born 1954) is the former Chief of Staff of the Egyptian Armed Forces. Previously he was Chief of Staff and then Commander of the Second Field Army (2010–2012), and then Secretary-General of the Ministry of Defence. He served as Chief of Staff from 28 October 2017 to 27 October 2021.

References 

Egyptian military officers
1954 births
Living people